The Cincinnati Zoo & Botanical Garden is the sixth oldest zoo in the United States, founded in 1873 and officially opening in 1875. It is located in the Avondale neighborhood of Cincinnati, Ohio. It was appointed as a National Historic Landmark in 1987.

The zoo houses over 500 species, 1800 animals and 3,000 plant species. In addition, the zoo also has conducted several breeding programs in its history, and was the first to successfully breed California sea lions. In 1986, the Lindner Center for Conservation and Research of Endangered Wildlife (CREW) was created to further the zoo's goal of conservation. The zoo is known for being the home of Martha, the last living passenger pigeon, and to Incas, the last living Carolina parakeet.

The zoo is an accredited member of the Association of Zoos and Aquariums (AZA), and a member of the World Association of Zoos and Aquariums (WAZA).

A 2014 ranking of the nations's best zoos by USA Today based on data provided by the Association of Zoos and Aquariums lists the Cincinnati Zoo among the best in the country. A 2019 reader's choice ranking of the nation's best zoos by USA Today named the Cincinnati Zoo the top zoo in North America.

History

In 1872, three years before the zoo's creation, Andrew Erkenbrecher and several other residents created the Society for the Acclimatization of Birds in Cincinnati to acquire insect-eating birds to control a severe outbreak of caterpillars. A collection of approximately 1,000 birds imported from Europe in 1872 was housed in Burnet Woods before being released. In 1873, members of the Society of Acclimatization began discussing the idea of starting a zoo and founded The Zoological Society of Cincinnati.

The Cincinnati Zoological Gardens officially opened its doors on September 18, 1875. Architect James W. McLaughlin, who constructed the zoo's first buildings, designed the earliest completed zoological exhibits in the United States. The zoo began with eight monkeys, two grizzly bears, three white-tailed deer, six raccoons, two elk, a buffalo, a laughing hyena, a tiger, an American alligator, a circus elephant, and over four hundred birds, including a talking crow. The first guide book about the Cincinnati Zoo was written in 1876 in German. The founders of the zoo, including its first general manager, were German immigrants and the city had quite a large German-speaking population. The first English-language edition (illustrated) was published in 1893.

In its first 20 years, the zoo experienced many financial difficulties, and despite selling  to pay off debt in 1886, it went into receivership in 1898. In order to prevent the zoo from being liquidated, the stockholders chose to give up their interests of the $225,000 they originally invested. For the next two years, the zoo was run under the Cincinnati Zoological Company as a business. In 1901, the Cincinnati Traction Company, purchased the zoo, hoping to use it as a way to market itself to potential customers. They operated the zoo until 1917, when the Cincinnati Zoological Park Association, funded by donations from philanthropists Mary Emery and Anna Sinton Taft and a wave of public desire to purchase the increasingly popular zoo, took over management. In 1932, the city purchased the zoo and started to run it through the Board of Park Commissioners. This marked the zoo's transition from its period of financial insecurity to its modern state of stable growth and fiscal stability.

In addition to its live animal exhibits, the zoo houses refreshments stands, a dance hall, roads, walkways, and picnic grounds. Between 1920 and 1972, the Cincinnati Summer Opera performed in an open-air pavilion and were broadcast by NBC radio.

In 1987, parts of the zoo were designated as a National Historic Landmark, the Cincinnati Zoo Historic Structures, due to their significant architecture featured in the Elephant House, the Reptile House, and the Passenger Pigeon Memorial.

Animals and exhibits

Elephant Reserve
The Herbivora building was constructed in 1906 for $50,000, a huge sum at the time. Listed on the National Register of Historic Places in 1975, it is considered one of the most spectacular historic buildings in the zoo world. In 2000, the attraction became Vanishing Giants, featuring giraffes, okapis and elephants. From 2007 to 2008, the giraffe and okapi yards were renovated into a food court area and their respective species moved to other areas in the zoo. It has since undergone several renovations and is now Cincinnati Zoo's Elephant Reserve.

Today, Elephant Reserve is home to two subspecies of the Asian elephant in a  exhibit with a 60,000 gallon pool in the female yard. The zoo has been trying to breed the two, but they have been unsuccessful since their last baby in 1998.

In the fall of 2024, the elephants will be moved to Elephant Trek and the former Elephant Reserve will be renamed into Jabiru Junction. Jabiru Junction would be a future home for jabirus and black-necked storks.

P&G Discovery Forest
Renovated in 1989, this classroom is used for live animal demonstrations for school groups and zoo visitors presented regularly during the summer. The building houses a few species, including a Linnaeus's two-toed sloths, blue-and-yellow macaws, and boa constrictors.

Eagle Eyrie
This flight cage opened in 1970 as one of the largest flight cages of its time. Originally containing bald eagles, these were moved elsewhere, and the exhibit currently features a Steller's sea eagle and an Andean condor.

Reptile House
The Reptile House is America's oldest surviving zoo building, built in 1875. Originally, it housed monkeys and other primates until 1951. Now, it is home to over 30 reptile species from around the world in both indoor and outdoor exhibits. Selected species include Chinese alligators, Gila monsters, brown anoles, emerald tree monitors, quince monitors, Pascagoula map turtles, pancake tortoises, spider tortoises, poison dart frogs, Titicaca water frogs, hellbenders, black rat snakes, corn snakes, rattlesnakes, pine snakes, king cobras, Indochinese spitting cobras, boa constrictors, emerald tree boas and West African Gaboon vipers. Neighboring the Reptile House are two outdoor exhibits featuring the Galápagos tortoises and bald eagles.

Gorilla World
This exhibit opened in 1978 as a naturalistic, rain forest habitat for the Cincinnati Zoo's western lowland gorillas. The Cincinnati Zoo leads the country in gorilla births with 48. Elle was the last gorilla born at the zoo in 2015. The zoo holds the record for having 6 gorilla births in one year in 1995. In this same year, one of their gorillas gave birth to the world's first test-tube gorilla. Near the gorilla exhibits, the zoo also features black-and-white colobus monkeys.

Night Hunters
The Carnivora Building was built in 1952. In 1985, it was renovated to become the Cat House. From 2010 to 2011, it was renovated again to become the Night Hunters exhibit. It is home to many nocturnal and/or predatory animals previously found in other exhibits throughout the zoo, including aardvarks, aardwolves, binturong, black-footed cats, fishing cats, common vampire bats, fennec foxes, Indian flying foxes, northern greater galagos, large-spotted genets, ocelots, Pallas's cats, ringtails, sand cats and tawny frogmouths. During the day, lights inside the building are kept very low to allow visitors to view the animals in their natural nocturnal habitats.

Cat Canyon
Cat Canyon links the Night Hunters experience with the former Tiger Canyon area to include new exhibits for cougars, Malayan tigers, and snow leopards. Cat Canyon provides an exciting, sensory adventure into the world of the great feline predators while strengthening the Zoo's commitment to the conservation of threatened species through education and scientific research in the wild and at the zoo. Included at the end of this trail is an exhibit housing Eurasian eagle-owls.

World of the Insect
Opened in 1978, this is the largest building in North America devoted to the display of live insects. The Cincinnati Zoo has been given four awards by the American Zoo and Aquarium Association for successful propagation of insects, and World of the Insect received the prized American Zoo and Aquarium Association exhibit award in 1979. This building also features the longest ant exhibit in the world, housing colonies of leafcutter ants. Some of its species include Antilles pinktoe tarantulas, Brazilian whiteknee tarantulas, dragon-headed katydids, Eastern lubber grasshoppers, marbled crayfish, Texas bullet ants and water scorpions.

Dragons!
This building features five species of colorful monitor lizards ranging from Southeast Asia and Australia. In the past, this exhibit housed other animal species until the zoo received the largest Komodo dragon to ever live in captivity in the Western Hemisphere, named Naga. He was a gift from George H. W. Bush from the Indonesian Government. The Cincinnati Zoo was the second U.S. zoo to exhibit Komodo dragons and the second zoo to breed them outside of Indonesia. The exhibit was renovated in 2009 and opened in June 2010. A few other species of lizards such as armadillo girdled lizards, blue tree monitors and Nile monitors are also housed in this complex.

Lemur Lookout
This open-aired exhibit was built in 1962 as Baboon Island and renovated as Ibex Island.

Otto M. Budig Manatee Springs
Manatee Springs, a $4,500,000 attraction, opened on May 21, 1999, and was awarded the Munson Aquatic Conservation Exhibitry Award and a Significant Achievement Exhibit Award from the American Zoo and Aquarium Association in 2000. The sights, sounds, and smells of Florida greet visitors as they enter Manatee Springs. Close-up viewing on both dry land, as well as dramatic underwater viewing of over 45 magnificent species provide an exciting experience for every Zoo visitor. Manatee Springs facilities include a greenhouse (304 m2) and an exhibit building (1035 m2). The entire facility (1339 m2) includes 171 m2 (1,900 ft²) of staff and support areas and 369m² (4,100 ft²) of filtration equipment space on two levels. The manatee tank is 120,000 gallons with 3 viewing areas including a bubble window. In addition to the central exhibit with Florida manatees, other Florida species are featured, including American alligators, American crocodiles, alligator gars, alligator snapping turtles, coastal plain cooters, loggerhead musk turtles, greater sirens, two-toed amphiumas and the invasive Burmese python.

Siegfried and Roy's White Lions of Timbavati 
This exhibit opened as Big Cat Canyon in 1975, containing three one-year old White tigers. In February and in August 1988, the Zoo attained rare white lion cubs donated to the zoo by Siegfried and Roy. These lions successfully bred four offspring in April 2001, but as of May 2022, they all passed away, and their exhibit now contains Bennett's wallabies.

Rhino Reserve
Built in 1935 as the African Veldt with large hoofed animals, the series of exhibits was renovated in 1997 to become Rhino Reserve. This area is home to Flamingo Cove with over twenty greater flamingos. The Cincinnati Zoo ranks as a U.S. leader in breeding eastern black rhinos with eighteen births over the course of their existence. Other featured species include okapi, yellow-backed duiker, plains zebra, eastern bongo, and Visayan warty pigs.

Spaulding Children's Zoo
Renovated in 1984–1985,  of exhibits that feature common barnyard animals, animals of the eastern American woodlands, and animals of the southwest American desert such as alpacas, llamas, Nigerian Dwarf goats, Juliana pigs, guinea pigs as well as Brazilian porcupines, radiated tortoises and southern tamanduas. There is a nursery where guests can see either babies born at the zoo or babies that came to the zoo. Volunteers and keepers bring a certain harmless animal out everyday for guests to be able to touch, and learn more about them. Lucille, a two-year old binturong, is the ambassador for the Cincinnati Bearcats.

Gibbon Islands
Completed in 1972, Gibbon Islands occupies the former location of the old Opera Pavilion. (From 1920 to 1971, the Cincinnati Zoo was home to the Cincinnati Opera Summer Festival.) These two islands are surrounded by water that flows from Swan Lake. Bamboo exercise bars are the stage for yellow-cheeked gibbons and siamangs who entertain visitors with their acrobatic antics and loud whooping calls while climbing on their giant jungle gyms.

Red Panda Habitat
Opened in 1985, this naturalistic woodland landscape includes many native Chinese plant species to simulate the natural forest habitat of the red panda. One pair of red pandas was a gift to the Cincinnati Zoo from the Beijing Zoo in China. These lavish exhibits are opened aired, connected by a small flowing stream under low elevated bridge. It also provides many tall trees for the five pandas to relax and sleep on.

Swan Lake
This big body of water takes up a lot of the zoo's ground near the entrance. The Cincinnati Zoo was the first place to exhibit and breed red-crowned cranes, trumpeter swans, wood ducks and various other waterfowl species are kept here.

Wolf Woods
Wolf Woods opened in 2005 after a renovation of Otter Creek. After another renovation in the summer of 2011, the second section focuses on the conservation story of the Mexican gray wolf native to the southwestern United States. Here, a rustic, historical trapper's cabin has been converted into a Mexican wolf field research station. Other species include the gray foxes, North American river otters, and barred owls.

Lords of the Arctic
Lords of the Arctic opened in 2000, housing species representing northern parts of the world in a  attraction. Originally housing polar bears; the last individual having passed away in 2021, the exhibit also features Arctic foxes. According to the zoo's master plan, the exhibit will become a home for American black bears, harbor seals, brown fur seals, New Zealand fur seals, walruses, Dalmatian pelicans, California sea lions, and sea otters.

Jungle Trails
Jungle Trails takes visitors through a  naturalized rain forest habitat, teeming with rare and exotic wildlife and hundreds of plant species from Asia, South America, and Africa. Each region in the exhibit is divided by outdoor and indoor habitats with enjoyable viewing of the Zoo's collection of rare primates birds, reptiles, insects, small mammals. The attraction received the AZA prestigious exhibit award in 1994, a year after it opened. First, a series of outdoor exhibits features Sumatran orangutans, white-handed gibbons, Müller's gibbons, helmeted curassows and blue-throated macaws. Next, an indoor building houses pygmy slow loris, golden-headed lion tamarins, and white-faced sakis, in addition to indoor housing for the orangutans and gibbons. Further on, another series of outdoor exhibits features black howlers, bonobos, Coquerel's sifakas, and Angola colobuses. The second building features West African pottos, and an aye-aye.

Birds of the World
Birds of the World features a wide-variety of bird species from throughout the entire world, including a selection of aviaries that guests can enter to get up close and personal. Birds housed include Bali mynas, boat-billed herons, buff-crested bustards, Guam rails, Inca terns, masked lapwings, peacocks, sunbitterns, thick-billed parrots, penguins and puffins.

(outside)

 Salmon-crested cockatoo
 Cape Barren goose
 Major Mitchell's cockatoo

(inside)

 Indian peacock
 South America: Scarlet ibis, Sunbittern, Boat-billed heron, Southern lapwing, Peruvian pigeon, Cattle egret, Blue-grey tanager, Red-capped cardinal, Yellow-rumped cacique, Inca tern, Guira cuckoo, Matamata turtle
 Blue-faced honeyeater, Asian fairy bluebird
 Australasia: Bali mynah, White-breasted woodswallow, Guam rail, White-naped pheasant pigeon, Nicobar pigeon, Masked lapwing, Shama thrush, Collared finchbill, Blue-crowned laughingthrush
 Mexico: Thick-billed parrot
 African Savannah: Buff-crested bustard, Golden-breasted starling, Red-and-yellow barbet, Yellow-fronted canary, Crested coua
 Southeast Asia: Rhinoceros hornbill
 Northern Oceans: Atlantic puffin, Pigeon guillemot, Common murre, Smew, Common eider, King eider, Harlequin duck, Horned puffin
 Southern Oceans: King penguin, Magellanic penguin, Southern rockhopper penguin, Chiloe wigeon, Black-faced ibis
 Free Flight Aviary: Victoria crowned pigeon, Ruddy shelduck, Chestnut-bellied malkoha, Magpie goose, Lady Ross's turaco, Red-legged seriema, Pied imperial pigeon, Ring-billed gull

Africa
The  $1.6 million Dobsa Giraffe Ridge opened on June 6, 2008, and allows guests to feed Masai giraffes from a tall elevated platform. Guests can also view the giraffes in their indoor  stalls especially during winter.

In the 2010s the zoo built an  Africa exhibit, the largest animal exhibit in its history. Phases I and II, completed in 2010, added an exhibit for cranes and expanded the Cheetah Encounter yard so that the cheetahs had a 40% larger running space. Phase III opened on June 29, 2013, and included a wider vista that offers visitors an opportunity to see African lions, servals, a bat-eared fox, African wild dogs, and a new cheetah exhibit. A new Base Camp Café, said to be the greenest restaurant in the US, was also added in the 2013 season.

Phase IV, the largest phase of the Africa expansion, opened on June 28, 2014. It introduced a wide savanna with common ostriches, crested guineafowl, pink-backed pelicans, Rüppell's vultures, lappet-faced vultures, and grey crowned cranes.

Phase V, the final phase of the expansion, opened on July 23, 2016, adding an area for Nile hippos, Hippo Cove, which provides both above and below-water viewing. A 34-year-old male named Henry from the Dickerson Park Zoo and a 17-year-old female named Bibi from the St. Louis Zoo joined the zoo. On the morning of January 24, 2017, Bibi gave birth to a six-weeks premature calf. The baby female hippo, named Fiona by zoo staff, is the first hippo to be born at the zoo in 75 years. Fiona was also the first Nile hippo to ever be captured on an ultrasound image. After intensive care from zoo keepers, veterinarians, and NICU specialists at Cincinnati Children's Hospital, Fiona survived.  The story of her trials and success made her an internet celebrity and city hero, and has dramatically increased zoo attendance. Henry's health declined later in 2017 and he was euthanized on October 31. On September 6th, 2021, a 19-year-old male named Tucker from the San Francisco Zoo joined the zoo. On August 24, 2022, Bibi gave birth to another calf which weighed roughly 60 pounds. This calf's was named Fritz, which was decided through a public vote.

On July 17, 2017, a black rhino calf, Kendi, was born to parents Faru and Seyia. Kendi's birth was captured on camera and can be viewed on the zoo's website. Curator of mammals at the zoo, Christina Gorsuch states, "This calf is only the fifth eastern black rhino born in the last two years in North America." She goes on to say "Every rhino calf born is incredibly important for the population, which includes fewer than 60 in North America. Calves will stay with their mothers for 3–4 years which means that the average female can only have one calf every 5 years." In 2015, AZA and Species Survival Plan (SSP) determined that parents Faru and Seyia were a good genetic match and recommended that they breed. Faru came to Cincinnati from Atlanta in the summer of 2015 and was introduced to Seyia.

Africa 

 Eastern white pelican
 Southern African lion
 Cheetah Encounter: Cheetah, Serval, Red river hog, African crested porcupine
 African Plains: Lesser kudu, Thomson's gazelle, White-bearded wildebeest, Lappet-faced vulture, Impala, Marabou stork, Ostrich, Pink-backed pelican, Kenyan crested guineafowl, Ruppell's vulture

Painted Dog Valley 

 African painted dog
 Meerkat

Hippo Cove 

 Hippopotamus
 Nile tilapia

Roo Valley
In August 2020, the Cincinnati Zoo finished the first part of their master plan "More Home To Roam". They turned their old Wildlife Canyon exhibit (former home of the critically endangered Sumatran rhino) into an exhibit called Roo Valley, the exhibit features the Zoo's first-ever kangaroo walkabout, with a new beer garden and restaurant, a big rope course over the habitat, and provides the largest outdoor little penguin habitat. Roo Valley adds five new species to the zoo as well, including red and western grey kangaroos, Australian wood ducks, New Zealand scaups and freckled ducks, the latter three species living side by side with the little penguins.

African Penguin Point
In September 2020, the Cincinnati Zoo finished the second part of the master plan. They turned their old sea lion habitat, sometimes referred to as "Seal Falls" until the passing of Duke the California sea lion in 2019, into a bigger exhibit for their African penguins, increasing their breeding success rate, while at the same time including some other African sea birds like the white-breasted cormorants, and yellow-billed ducks.

Center for Conservation and Research of Endangered Wildlife (CREW)
The Cincinnati Zoo has been active in breeding animals to help save species, starting as early as 1880 with the first hatching of a trumpeter swan in a zoo, as well as four passenger pigeons. This was followed in 1882 with the first American bison born in captivity.

In 1986, the zoo established the Carl H. Lindner Jr. Family Center for Conservation and Research of Endangered Wildlife for the purpose of using science and technology to understand, preserve, and propagate endangered flora and fauna and facilitate the conservation of global biodiversity.
Its Frozen Zoo plays a major role. In it are stored over 2,500 specimens representing approximately 60 animal and 65 plant species.
Terri Roth is CREW's director.

The successful breeding programs have earned the zoo nicknames like "the world's sexiest zoo" and "sexiest zoo in America".

"More Home to Roam" expansion campaign 
In 2018 the zoo launched an expansion campaign named "More Home to Roam" with the goal of raising $150 million to be used on developing new attractions and infrastructure. The zoo opened the Roo Valley and Penguin Point in summer of 2020, and they have plans to renovate the Lords of the Arctic area to bring back polar bear. The Rhino Reserve renovations and a 1,800 vehicle parking garage will hopefully be open by 2023, Elephant Trek will open in fall of 2024, and the old elephant exhibit will be changed into Giraffe Junction, where they will repair the concreate dome, replace the roof, install new windows, adding a new garden area, and a habitat for giraffes. The plan also includes a new entrance to facilitate traffic into the zoo. The additions are also aimed at making the zoo net zero in terms of waste, water, and energy, making the facilities waste free.

Philanthropists Harry and Linda Fath contributed $50 million to the campaign in June 2018. Previous expansion efforts, such as the Africa exhibit and gorilla exhibit, cost $34 million and $18 million respectively.

As result on the COVID-19 pandemic, the zoo tabled its original plan to build a parking garage and bumped Elephant Trek to the top of the priority list.  On June 15, 2021, the Zoo Broke ground on the Biggest Habitat in Zoo History: Elephant Trek; The Elephant Trek will be five times the size of the Zoo's current elephant habitat, is slated to open in 2024 and will eventually be home to a multi-generational herd of 8–10 Asian elephants. The exhibit will also include Siamang’s Point & Asian small-clawed otter Clawed River Otter Habitat and New Picnic Shelter Complex.

Notable animals 
Animals at the zoo have held several records, including the longest living American alligator in captivity at the time (at about 70 years of age), the fastest cheetah in captivity, and the largest Komodo dragon. The zoo was the first in the United States to put an aye-aye on display, and after losing its last aye-aye in 1993, it finally acquired another in 2011 – a six-year old transferred from the Duke Lemur Center in North Carolina.

The zoo is one of only a dozen in North America to house and breed bonobos (also known as pygmy chimpanzees), an endangered species of the great apes.

On January 6 and 7, the zoo celebrated the birth of its first babies of 2020. Two penguin chicks hatched, one each day.

Susie 

In 1931, Robert J. Sullivan permanently loaned the zoo a female eastern gorilla named Susie.  Captured in the Belgian Congo, Susie was first sold to a group of French explorers who sent her to France.  In August 1929, Susie was transported from Europe to the United States aboard the airship Graf Zeppelin accompanied by William Dressman.  After Susie completed a tour through the United States and Canada with Ringling Bros. and Barnum & Bailey Circus, Sullivan purchased Susie for $4,500 and loaned her to the zoo.  Dressman, who stayed on as Susie's trainer after she was loaned to the zoo, taught her how eat with a knife and fork and orchestrated two performances every day.  Susie was so popular that on her birthday on August 7, 1936, more than 16,000 visitors flocked to the zoo.  Susie remained one of the most popular animals at the zoo until her death on October 29, 1947. Her body was donated to the University of Cincinnati, where her skeleton remained on display until it was destroyed in a fire in 1974.

Harambe 

On May 28, 2016, Harambe, a 17-year-old,  male western lowland gorilla, was fatally shot by zoo officials after a three-year-old boy climbed into Harambe's enclosure. The incident was recorded by a bystander and uploaded to YouTube, where the video went viral. Zoo director Thane Maynard stated, "The child was being dragged around ... His head was banging on concrete. This was not a gentle thing. The child was at risk." The shooting was controversial, with some observers stating that it was not clear whether or not Harambe was likely to harm the child. Others called for the boy's parents and/or the zoo to be held accountable for the gorilla's death.

The boy was transported to the hospital with non-life-threatening injuries after being rescued. Police investigated possible criminal charges, while the parents of the boy defended the zoo's actions. The incident received global publicity; comedian and actor Ricky Gervais, rock guitarist and astrophysicist Brian May, and journalist and television personality Piers Morgan criticized the shooting, while real estate developer and then-presidential candidate Donald Trump and zoo director and notable animal expert Jack Hanna both lamented the shooting but defended the zoo's decision to prioritize the boy's safety.

Fiona

In January 2017, the zoo had its first birth of a hippopotamus in 75 years. Named Fiona, she was born six weeks prematurely and her survival was in doubt.  At the time of her birth, she weighed only 29 pounds, which was 25 pounds less than the lowest recorded birthweight for her species. The zoo's efforts to save her and her subsequent improvement to good health provided a viral sensation on the internet. At the age of four, Fiona weighed 1,600 pounds.

See also 

 Binti Jua
 Cincinnati Zoo Historic Structures
 List of botanical gardens and arboretums in the United States
 Sarah (cheetah)
 Martha (passenger pigeon)
 Incas (Carolina parakeet)

References

External links

Cincinnati Zoo & Botanical Garden on zooinstitutes.com

Zoos in Ohio
Tourist attractions in Cincinnati
Botanical gardens in Ohio
1875 establishments in Ohio
Protected areas of Hamilton County, Ohio
Institutions accredited by the American Alliance of Museums
Zoos established in 1875